Singapore has taken a series of measures against Middle East respiratory syndrome (MERS) and the potential threat of a pandemic.

Status
 62 suspected MERS cases investigated, all negative reports Ministry of Health (Singapore)
 Middle East Respiratory Syndrome Coronavirus (MERS-CoV) Health Advisory for July 2015 including a YouTube video.

Risk assumption
When planning the response, it is assumed that the first local human case is likely to be imported from affected countries and is difficult to prevent. The virus, which is more infectious than SARS, is likely to spread quickly and has a high morbidity and mortality.

Measures

Health advisory

Those who develop flu-like symptoms should seek medical help promptly, and inform the doctors of their travel history.

Surveillance

Surveillance for influenza involves monitoring for virus strains and disease activity. A nationwide reporting scheme for acute respiratory infections has been established. The National Influenza Centre routinely carried out virological testing of respiratory samples from hospitals and polyclinics.

Hospital and medicine
To tackle a possible outbreak of Middle East respiratory syndrome, Singapore is increasing its resource such as isolation facilities in hospitals and stockpiling medicine.

Outbreak response plan

In the event of the pandemic, Singapore will require health screening, social distancing and contact tracing of all visitors, as during the 2003 SARS crisis, COVID-19 pandemic and quarantine suspected victims through the Stay-Home Notice (SHN). DORSCON remains at Green at that stage in 2015.

References

Health in Singapore